Aquhorthies may refer to:

 Easter Aquhorthies a stone circle near Inverurie, Aberdeenshire.
 Aquhorthies stone circle near Old Bourtreebush, Aberdeenshire.
 Aquhorthies College, a former Roman Catholic seminary from 1799 to 1829.